Entomophaga exoleta is a species of tachinid flies in the genus Entomophaga of the family Tachinidae.

Distribution
United Kingdom, France, Hungary.

References

Diptera of Europe
Tachininae
Insects described in 1824